The 1967  Houston Oilers season was the eighth season for the Houston Oilers as a professional AFL franchise;  The team improved on their previous output of 3–11, with a 9–4–1 record. They won the Eastern Division and qualified for the postseason for the first time in five seasons, but lost to the Raiders in the AFL Championship Game at Oakland.

Roster

Schedule

Game summaries

Week 16

Playoffs

Standings

References

Houston Oilers seasons
Houston Oilers
Houston